Kenneth Thad Bibb Jr. is a United States Air Force major general who served as the commander of the Eighteenth Air Force from 2020 to 2022. Previously, he was the director of strategic plans, programs, requirements, and analyses of the Air Force Materiel Command.

In March 2022, Bibb was reassigned as deputy inspector general of the Department of the Air Force.

Dates of promotion

References

External links

Year of birth missing (living people)
Living people
United States Air Force generals